Llanishen is a village in Monmouthshire, south east Wales, United Kingdom.

History and amenities 
The village takes its name from the original dedication of the parish church to St. Isan or Issien, who was said to have been a follower of the 6th century Celtic St. Illtyd.  The church is mentioned in the 12th century Book of Llandaff.

The existing church is dedicated to St. Dennis. It was completely rebuilt in 1852–54 and no evidence of an earlier church remains. Pant-glas Farmhouse and its barn are situated to the north of the church and both have Grade II* listed building status.

The village is set within what is termed the Wye Valley Forest Park, the upland area within the River Wye AONB.

Llanishen has one public house, The Carpenter's Arms, which was dates from 1700. The front part was added in about 1800. The premises were used at one time to bake and sell bread. Much of the public area has been altered in recent years.

The village has a Village Hall which serves the three parishes of Llanishen, Llanfihangel-Tor-Y-Mynydd and Trellech Grange.

References

External links
  Kelly's Directory 1901
  Geograph photos of the area
 St. Dennis church, Llanishen
 Llanishen Village Hall

Villages in Monmouthshire